Athis-de-l'Orne is a former commune in the Orne department in northwestern France. On 1 January 2016, it was merged into the new commune of Athis-Val-de-Rouvre. The modifier "de l'Orne" was added to the name in 1968, to distinguish it from Athis in the departement of Marne and Athis-Mons in the departement of Essonne.

The rivers Vère and Lembron run through it. The church of St. Vigor dates from the 19th century.

Population

International relations
It has been twinned since 1980 with Bromyard in Herefordshire, England, and since 1986 with Schöppenstedt in Wolfenbüttel, Lower Saxony, Germany.

Heraldry

See also
 Communes of the Orne department

References

Former communes of Orne